The Marka (also Marka Dafing, Meka, or Maraka) people are a Mande people of northwest Mali. They speak the Marka language, a Manding language. Some of the Maraka (Dafin people are found in Ghana.

History
Muslim merchant communities at the time of the Bambara Empire, the Maraka largely controlled the desert-side trade between the sahel communities and nomadic berber tribes who crossed the Sahara. The Bambara integrated Maraka communities into their state structure, and Maraka trading posts and plantations multiplied in the Segu based state and its Kaarta vassals in the 18th and early 19th centuries. When the pagan Bambara empire was defeated by the Maraka's fellow Muslim Umar Tall in the 1850s, the Maraka's unique trade and landholdings concessions suffered damage from which they never recovered.

Today
Today there are only around 25,000 Marka speakers, and they are largely integrated amongst their Soninke and Bambara neighbors.

Culture 
The Marka people are adherents of Islam.

References

Richard L. Roberts. Warriors, Merchants and Slaves: The State and the Economy in the Middle Niger Valley 1700-1914. Stanford University Press (1987), .
Richard L. Roberts. Production and Reproduction of Warrior States: Segu Bambara and Segu Tokolor, c. 1712-1890. The International Journal of African Historical Studies, Vol. 13,No. 3 (1980),pp. 389–419.

Ethnic groups in Mali
History of Mali
Toucouleur Empire
Bamana Empire
Soninke people